The 58th Independent Motorized Infantry Brigade is a formation of the Ukrainian Ground Forces. The brigade was activated on 17 February 2015 in Sumy and took command of three volunteer territorial defence battalions. The brigade fought for nine months in Eastern Ukraine until it was garrisoned back in Konotop on April 1, 2018.

Inna Derusova joined the Armed Forces of Ukraine in 2015 and served as a combat medic with the brigade. She was called "Violet" (after the small flower) because she was initially the only woman in the brigade. She was a sergeant. She had a lot of responsibilities, as the head of the medical service, of the medical center, and as a medical instructor. Many medics from civilian life passed through her training to become combat medics in a few weeks. Derusova died after the beginning of the 2022 Russian invasion of Ukraine and was posthumously awarded the Gold Star of the Hero of Ukraine.

Current Structure 
As of 2017 the brigade's structure is as follows:

 58th Independent Motorized Infantry Brigade, Konotop
 Headquarters & Headquarters Company
 13th Motorized Infantry Battalion "Chernihiv-1"
 15th Motorized Infantry Battalion "Sumy"
 16th Motorized Infantry Battalion "Poltava"
 Brigade Artillery Group
 Headquarters & Target Acquisition Battery
 Howitzer Artillery Battalion (D-20)
 Anti-tank Artillery Battalion (MT-12 Rapira)
 Anti-Aircraft Missile Artillery Battalion
 Reconnaissance Company
 Tank Company
 Engineer Company
 Maintenance Company
 Logistic Company
 Signal Company
 Medical Company
 Sniper Platoon

References

Motorized brigades of Ukraine
Military units and formations established in 2015
Military units and formations of Ukraine in the war in Donbas
Military units and formations of the 2022 Russian invasion of Ukraine
Military units and formations of the Russo-Ukrainian War